Greg Orloff is an American film sound mixer. He has won an Academy Award for Best Sound and has been nominated for another three in the same category. He has won a British Academy Award (BAFTA) and has been nominated for another three in the same category. He has won two Cinema Audio Society awards and has been nominated another six times. He has also been nominated for six Emmy Awards. He is known for his frequent collaborations with The Coen Brothers and Adam Sandler. He has worked on over 200 films since 1979. He is the brother of screenwriter John Orloff.

Selected filmography
Orloff has won an Academy Award and has been nominated for another three:

Won
 Ray (2004)

Nominated
 No Country for Old Men (2007)
 True Grit (2010)
 Inside Llewyn Davis (2013)

References

External links

Year of birth missing (living people)
Living people
American audio engineers
Best Sound Mixing Academy Award winners
Best Sound BAFTA Award winners